The 10 Hours of Messina (Italian: 10 ore di Messina or 10 ore notturna messinese) was a sports car race, organized by the Automobile Club d'Italia, held for the first time on 24 August 1952 in the street circuit of Messina, Italy. From 1959 it was replaced by Messina Grand Prix.

Editions

See also
 Messina Grand Prix (auto race that replaced it)

Notes

References

External links
 Gare Automobilistiche Messinesi 
 Cinque gloriose manifestazioni sportive che non esistono più 

 
Sports competitions in Messina
Recurring sporting events established in 1952
Recurring sporting events disestablished in 1958
1952 establishments in Italy
1958 disestablishments in Italy